Reserve player may refer to:
A player available to substitute for a player in the starting lineup
A player on the reserve team and not on the main roster
A player on the injured reserve list